Freaky Eaters may refer to:

Freaky Eaters (UK TV programme), a documentary programme which aired on BBC Three from 2007 to 2009.
Freaky Eaters (U.S. TV program), based on the UK version, which aired on TLC from 2010 to 2011.